This article contains the index of articles related to Jainism.  
What links here is a special page for finding related articles (it is not entirely accurate though, enter Jainism for example, and then verify context by searching for "Jain" within any article linked there).  Otherwise, section signs next to index entries indicate pages of links that serve as expanded sections (or could be added here individually). Book sources may also be included, essentially as a separate list type of article that is generated for the ISBN of each publication related to this topic. Jainism is characterized by diverse points of view, which such an index might reflect.



A
 The A to Z of Jainism
 ABC of Jainism
 Abhinandananatha (4th Tirthankara)
 Abhisheka (ritual)
 Acharanga Sutra (book)
 Acharanga and Kalpa Sutra
 Acharya (preceptor)
 Adipurana (poem)
 Adipurana (vol 1: ,)
 Afterlife (concept)
 Ahimsa (virtue)
 Ahimsa Award
 Ahimsa Statue
 Ajitanatha (2nd Tirthankara)
 Ajnana (ancient Indian philosophy)
 Akasha (aether)
 Altruism (selflessness)
 Ancient art
 Ancient economic thought
 Ancient history (of religion and philosophy)
 Ancient philosophy
 Anantanatha (14th Tirthankara)
 Anekantavada (doctrine)
 Animal shelter
 Animal welfare
 Anointing (ritual)
 Antakrddaasah (text)
 Anuttaraupapatikadasah (text)
 Aparigraha (virtue)
 Aranatha (18th Tirthankara)
 Arithmetic
 Aryika (nun)
 Asceticism (lifestyle)
 List of Jain ascetics
 List of Digambar Jain ascetics
 Ashoka (historical figure)
 Ashtamangala (symbols)
 Asia (continent)
 Asiatic Society of Mumbai (holdings)
 Asteya (virtue)
 Astika and nastika (propositions)
 Atomism (theory)
 Aura (paranormal)
 Ayodhya (city)

B
 Babri Masjid (mosque)
 Badami cave temples
 Beef (religious prohibitions)
 Bhajan (music)
 Bhaktamara Stotra (prayer)
 Bhaktamar Stotra: The Song of Salvation
 Bhakti (devotion)
 Bhakti movement
 Bhattaraka (preceptor)
 Bhavana (tenet)
 Bhavyata (quality)
 Binary logarithm (mathematics)
 Biocentrism (ethics)
 Blind men and an elephant (parable)
 Bombay mix (snack)
 Bombay Presidency (history)
 Brahmacharya (vow)
 Brahmi script
 Brahmin (ascription)
 Brahmanism
 Brooms in religion

C
 Caste system in India
 Cattle in religion and mythology
 Cattle slaughter in India
 Cavalry (history)
 Celibacy (vow)
 Champat Rai Jain (writer)
 Chamunda (goddess)
 Chandraprabha (8th Tirthankara)
 Chastity (comparative)
 Clairvoyance
 Cloth filter
 Clothing
 Communities
 Compassion
 Consecration (ceremony)
 Conceptions of God
 Cosmography
 Creator deity (comparative)
 Cremation (convention)
 Criticism of Jainism
 Cross (comparative)
 Cult image
 Culture and menstruation

D 
 Dashlakshan Dharma (festival)
 Death (concept)
 Demographics of the world
 Deep ecology (philosophy)
 Deity (comparative)
 Detachment (philosophy)
 Deva (celestial being)
 Dharma (religion)
 Dharmanatha (15th Tirthankara)
 Dhimmi (status)
 Dialectic (method)
 Digambara monk
 Diwali (festival)
 Dreams (auspicious)

E
 East Indies
 Eastern philosophy
 Eastern religions
 Ecopsychology
 Ecospirituality
 Elemental (being)
 Ellora Caves
 Mircea Eliade (historian of religion)
 Encyclopaedia of Jainism (30 volumes )
 Encyclopedia of Jain Religion (11 volumes )
 Enlightenment (spiritual)
 Entheogen (psychoactive substance)
 Epic poetry
 Epigraphy (inscriptions)
 Jacob Epstein (sculptor)
 Eternal return (concept)
 Ethics of Jainism
 Ethics in religion
 Jainism in Europe
 Problem of Evil
 Existence of God

F
 Fasting
 Fasting in Jainism
 Jain Festivals
 Ficus (fig tree)
 Ficus religiosa
 Five Thieves (foibles)
 Flag
 Flat Earth
 Flavor (dietary restrictions)
 Food and drink prohibitions
 Forgiveness
 Fraction (mathematics)
 Freedom of religion
 Fruitarianism

G
 Ganadhara (disciple)
 Gandhism
 Garlic (spiritual and religious uses)
 Gelatin (dietary restrictions)
 Gender and religion
 Giant (mythology)
 Eric Gill (sculpture)
 Glossary of Hinduism terms
 Glossary of Indian culture
 Glossary of philosophy
 Glossary of spirituality terms
 Glossary of the Tribes and Castes of the Punjab and North-West Frontier Province
 Jain Gods (template)
 Golden Rule
 Green Man (motif)
 Growth of religion (statistic)
 Gunasthana (levels of virtue)
 Guru (preceptor)
 Gurukula (school)
 Jain Gurus (template)
 Guru Purnima (festival)
 Guru–shishya tradition
 Gymnosophists (nickname)

H
 Hagiography (religious biography)
 Hair removal
 Haribhadra (author)
 Hexagram (shape)
 Himalayas (mountain range)
 Hindi literature
 Hindu (semantics)
 Hindu law (historical term)
 History of Ahmedabad
 History of alcoholic drinks
 History of art
 History of Asian art
 History of atheism
 History of Bankura district
 History of Bareilly
 History of Bengal
 History of Bihar
 History of Buddhism
 History of chemistry
 History of combinatorics
 History of Delhi
 History of education in the Indian subcontinent
 History of games
 History of Goa
 History of Gujarat
 History of the Hindu–Arabic numeral system
 History of Hinduism
 History of Hindustani
 History of human sexuality
 History of Jainism
 History of Jainism (category)
 History of Jaipur
 History and culture of Kaviyoor
 History of Karnataka
 History of Kerala
 History of large numbers
 History of metallurgy in South Asia
 History of Mymensingh
 History of Odisha
 History of Pakistan
 History of Patna
 History of Rajasthan
 History of religions
 History of religions (template)
 History of religious pluralism
 History of the Republic of India
 History of science and technology in the Indian subcontinent
 History of South Asian cuisine
 History of South India
 History of Tamil Nadu
 History of Udaipur
 History of vegetarianism
 History of Wayanad
 Human history
 Holiday (religious)
 Homa (ritual)
 Jainism in Hong Kong
 House temple (shrine)
 Hoysala architecture
 Human sacrifice
 Humanities (religion)
 Hunting

I
 Idolatry (devotional)
 Immortality
 Impalement in myth and art
 Index of Buddhism-related articles
 Index of Eastern philosophy articles
 Index of ethics articles
 Index of philosophy articles (A–C)
 Index of philosophy articles (D–H)
 Index of philosophy articles (I–Q)
 Index of philosophy articles (R–Z)
 Index of philosophy of religion articles
 Index of religion-related articles
 India
 Arts and entertainment in India
 Culture of India
 Demographics of India
 History of India
 Jainism in India
 Names of India
 Outline of India
 Indian art
 Indian astronomy
 Indian classical music
 Indian company law
 Indian cuisine
 Indian epic poetry
 Indian literature
 Indian mathematics
 Indian Penal Code
 Indian people
 Indian philosophy
 Indian religions
 Indian rock-cut architecture
 Indology
 Indomania
 Indra (mythology)
 Infinity (philosophy)
 Ink (history)
 Institute of Jainology > JAINpedia (project)
 International Journal of Jaina Studies
 Introspection (pratikraman)
 Irreligion in India
 Itihasa (tradition)

J
 Jade
 Jai Jinendra (greeting)
 Jain Agamas (original texts)
 Jain Bunt (community)
 Jain cosmology
 Jain Desi khana (cookbook )
 Jain epistemology
 Jain monasticism
 Jain philosophy
 The Jain Saga (3 volumes )
 Jain Sculpture
 Jain terms and concepts
 Jainism (categories)
 Jainism (template)
 Jainism (topic)
 Jainism Topics (template)
 Jainism in Japan
 Religion in Japan (Jainakyo)
 Jainism and non-creationism
 List of Jains
 The Jains
 Jambudvipa (placename)
 Janna (poet)
 Japa (repetition)
 Jinvani (message)
 Jiva (self)
 Jizya (tax)

K
 Kalpasutra (book)
 Kalpa Sutra of Bhadrabahu Svami
 Kalpavriksha (divine tree)
 Kamandalu (pot)
 Kannada (language)
 Karma
 Karma in Jainism
 Karuna (compassion)
 Kashaya (passion)
 Kathmandu (city)
 Kevala Jnana (omniscience)
 Killing of animals
 Kiss (history)
 Khajuraho Group of Monuments
 Krishna (legend)
 Kunthunatha (17th Tirthankara)

L
 Lake Manasarovar
 Lakshmi (deity)
 Languages
 Indo-Aryan languages
 Leather
 Lesya (color karma)
 Library of Congress Classification (1300-1380)
 Life Force: The World of Jainism 
 Linguistic history of the Indian subcontinent
 Lipi (writing system)
 List of Amar Chitra Katha comics
 List of animal rights advocates
 List of Asian cuisines
 List of Bhairava temples
 List of buildings and structures
 List of contemporary ethnic groups
 List of converts to Hinduism
 List of countries by cremation rate
 List of creation myths
 List of cultural heritage sites in Sindh
 List of diets
 List of epics in the Kannada language
 List of ethics journals
 List of ethnic religions
 List of festivals in Nepal
 List of flag names
 List of flags by color combination
 List of founders of religious traditions
 List of Indian government agencies
 List of Indian inventions and discoveries
 List of Indian organisations in Singapore
 List of inventions and discoveries of the Indus Valley Civilisation
 List of Karnataka literature
 List of largest monoliths
 List of legendary creatures (H)
 List of legendary creatures (P)
 List of legendary creatures (Y)
 List of milestones in Kannada literature
 List of modern writers on Eastern religions
 List of Monuments of National Importance in Agra circle
 List of Monuments of National Importance in Andhra Pradesh
 List of Monuments of National Importance in Aurangabad circle
 List of Monuments of National Importance in Bangalore circle
 List of Monuments of National Importance in Belgaum district
 List of Monuments of National Importance in Daman and Diu
 List of Monuments of National Importance in Gujarat
 List of Monuments of National Importance in Kerala
 List of Monuments of National Importance in Lalitpur district
 List of Monuments of National Importance in Lucknow circle/South
 List of Monuments of National Importance in Madhya Pradesh/East
 List of Monuments of National Importance in Madhya Pradesh/West
 List of Monuments of National Importance in Pudukkottai district
 List of Monuments of National Importance in Rajasthan
 List of Monuments of National Importance in Thrissur circle
 List of Monuments of National Importance in West Bengal
 List of mythological objects
 List of northernmost items
 List of North Karnataka historical sites
 List of Pakistani inventions and discoveries
 List of Penguin Classics
 Lists of people by belief
 List of people who died of starvation
 List of people on the postage stamps of India
 List of philosophical concepts
 List of philosophies
 List of places in Multan
 List of places named after people
 List of poets
 List of postage stamps of India
 Lists of religious leaders by century
 List of religious populations
 List of religious sites
 List of religious sites in Wayanad
 List of religions and spiritual traditions
 List of religious buildings and structures of the Kingdom of Mysore
 List of renamed Indian cities and states
 List of rock-cut temples in India
 List of State Protected Monuments in Bihar
 List of State Protected Monuments in Goa
 List of State Protected Monuments in Gujarat
 List of State Protected Monuments in Himachal Pradesh
 List of State Protected Monuments in Karnataka
 List of State Protected Monuments in Madhya Pradesh
 List of State Protected Monuments in Maharashtra
 List of State Protected Monuments in Rajasthan
 List of State Protected Monuments in Uttar Pradesh
 List of State Protected Monuments in West Bengal
 List of tallest statues
 List of the tallest statues in India
 List of Teachers' Days
 List of temples in Bhubaneswar
 List of temples in Kanchipuram
 List of temples in Lahore
 List of timelines
 List of tree deities
 List of tourist attractions in Bangalore
 List of tourist attractions in Delhi
 List of tourist attractions in Jabalpur
 List of tourist attractions in Jaipur
 List of tourist attractions in Kolkata
 List of tourist attractions in Surat
 List of tourist attractions in Vijayawada
 List of vegetarians
 List of vegetarian festivals
 List of vegetarian organizations
 List of vegetarian restaurants
 List of vegetarian and vegan companies
 List of Vijayanagara era temples in Karnataka
 List of world folk-epics
 List of World Heritage Sites in India
 List of World Heritage Sites in Pakistan
 List of Yangon City Heritage
 Jain Literature (template)
 Lives of the Jain Elders
 Living things in culture
 Indian Logic (Jain logic)
 Longsight (area)
 Lord (comparative)
 Loving-kindness
 Lotus position
 Lunisolar calendar

M
 Mahabharata (epic poem)
 Mahamastakabhisheka (festival)
 Mahatma (scholar)
 Mahatma Gandhi (influences)
 Mahavira (24th Tirthankara)
 Mahavira: The Hero of Nonviolence
 Mahavira (mathematician)
 Maha vratas (Major vows)
 Mallinatha (19th Tirthankara)
 Mango (fruit)
 Mantra (sacred utterance)
 Mardava (humility)
 Materialism (philosophy)
 Maya (illusion)
 Meaning of life
 Meat (religious traditions)
 Meditation
 Mendicant (beggar)
 Mercy
 Thomas Merton (Catholic writer)
 Metropolitan Museum of Art (Asian art)
 Microbiology
 Microorganism
 Milk
 Missionary
 Moksha (salvation)
 Monastery (vihara)
 Monasticism (comparative)
 Monk (comparative)
 Moral relativism
 Moral status of animals in the ancient world
 Morality and religion
 Most-perfect magic square
 Mound (archaeology)
 Mount Kailash
 Mount Meru
 Munisuvrata (20th Tirthankara)
 Murtipujaka (subsect)
 Museum of Asian Art (Germany)
 Mysticism

N
 Nair (castes)
 Naked yoga
 Names of God
 Naminatha (21st Tirthankara)
 Namokar Mantra (prayer)
 Namokar Mantra and the Science of Sound
 Narada (legend)
 Naraka (realm)
 Nath (lord)
 Naturism
 Navaratna (nine gems)
 Neminatha (22nd Tirthankara)
 Religion in New Zealand
 Night in paintings (Eastern art)
 Nirvana
 Nirvana Kanda (sacred sites)
 Nonkilling studies (Wikiversity) > Jainism (page)
 Nondualism
 Nontheistic religion
 Nonviolence
 Nonviolent Communication (philosophy of Ahimsa)
 Nudity in religion
 Nun (comparative)

O
 Odia language
 Odissi (dance)
 Om (veneration)
 Omniscience
 Oral tradition
 Organizations
 Orthopraxy (conduct)
 Outline of ancient India
 Outline of Assam
 Outline of Andhra Pradesh
 Outline of Arunachal Pradesh
 Outline of the creation–evolution controversy
 Outline of Kerala
 Outline of Maharashtra
 Outline of metaphysics
 Outline of philosophy
 Outline of Rajasthan
 Outline of religion
 Outline of self
 Outline of theology

P
 Pacifism (comparative)
 Padmaprabha (6th Tirthankara)
 Paduka (footwear)
 Panca-Paramesthi (supreme beings)
 Prakrit (language)
 Papa (comparative)
 Parasparopagraho Jivanam (aphorism)
 Paroksha (Indian philosophy)
 Parliament of the World's Religions
 Pascal's triangle (mathematics)
 Parshvanatha (23rd Tirthankara)
 Passions (philosophy)
 Peace and conflict studies
 Peace Mala (project)
 Perspectivism (see also)
 Philosophical skepticism
 Jain Philosophy (template)
 Philosophy of history
 Place of worship
 Places of worship in Bangalore
 Plants in culture
 Pope John Paul II (relations)
 Postage stamps (India)
 Poverty (voluntary)
 Pramada (Indian philosophy)
 Pratima (stages of spiritual rise for lay person)
 Prayer
 Proselytism
 Prostration (gesture)
 Public nudity
 Puranas (literature)
 Pushpadanta (9th Tirthankara)
 Pyrrho (Greek philosopher)

Q
 Queen Trishala
 Quotes (Wikiquote)

R
 Raga (music)
 Rajabai Clock Tower (history)
 Ramayana (Indian epic poem)
 Ratnatraya (philosophy)
 Reality
 Reincarnation (afterlife)
 Relationship between religion and science
 Relativism
 Religiocentrism
 Religion (comparative)
 Religion and environmentalism
 Religion and peacebuilding
 Religion and science (category)
 Historical Vedic religion
 Religious conversion
 Religious education
 Major religious groups
 Religious law (comparative)
 New religious movement (history)
 Religious pluralism
 Religious studies
 Religious text
 Religious views on euthanasia
 Religious views on organ donation
 Religious views on suicide
 Religious views on truth
 Religious violence in India
 Right to die
 Rishabhanatha (1st Tirthankara)

S
 Sacred Books of the East
 Sacred language
 Sacred mountains
 Sacred natural site
 Salt
 Salvation
 Samadhi (meditative state)
 Saman Suttam (bible)
 Samayika (vow)
 Sambhavanatha (3rd Tirthankara)
 Samsara (existence)
 Samskara (philosophy)
 Sanctity of life
 Sandalwood
 Sanskrit (language)
 Sant (truthteller)
 Saraks (community)
 Sati (practice)
 Satya (truth)
 Schism (division)
 Schools (sects)
 Sculpture in South Asia
 Sect
 Sentience
 Seven-valued logic
 Shantinatha (16th Tirthankara)
 Shastra (treatise)
 Shaving (in religion)
 Shitalanatha (10th Tirthankara)
 Shreyanasanatha (11th Tirthankara)
 Siddhanta (term)
 Siddhasena Divakara (author)
 Simple living
 Jainism in Singapore
 Religion in Singapore
 Singing to the Jinas
 Snakes and Ladders (game)
 Skyclad (Neopaganism)
 Solar symbol
 Soteriology (study of salvation)
 Soul
 Spiritual ecology
 Spiritual evolution
 Spirituality (note 8)
 Sramana (ascetics)
 Starvation
 Statistics of Jainism
 Status as a distinct religion
 Sthanakvasi (subsect)
 Stotra (song)
 Succubus (Yakshini)
 Sumatinatha (5th Tirthankara)
 Suparshvanatha (7th Tirthankara)
 Sutra (aphorisms)
 Svetambara (sect)
 Terapanth (subsect)
 Swastika (Svetambar symbol)
 Symbols

T
 Tala (music)
 Tandava (dance)
 Tantra (sutra)
 Tattva (truths)
 Tattvartha Sutra (universal book)
 Tattvartha Sutra
 Teaching stories
 Temple
 Jain Temple
 Temples (list)
 Temples (template)
 Jain Temples in Gujarat
 Jain Temples of Rajasthan
 Jain Texts (list)
 Third gender
 Thought for the Day (broadcast)
 Time
 Timeline of Ahmedabad
 Timeline of algebra
 Timeline of ancient history
 Timeline of animal welfare and rights
 Timeline of atomic and subatomic physics
 Timeline of Eastern philosophers
 Timeline of geometry
 Timeline of Goan history
 Timeline of Indian history
 Timeline of Indian innovation
 Timeline of Jainism
 Timeline of Jainism (template)
 Timeline of Karnataka
 Timeline of mathematics
 Timeline of numerals and arithmetic
 Timeline of Raleigh, North Carolina
 Timeline of religion
 Timeline of South Asian history
 Tirtha (sites)
 Tirthankara (Jinas)
 List of the 24 tirthankaras
 Tomoe (shape)
 Tourism in India by state
 Transtheism (attribution)
 Trees in mythology
 Trinidad and Tobago (country)
 Two truths doctrine

U
 Udayagiri Caves
 Umaswami (author)
 Underworld (mythology)
 Jainism in the United States
 Universe (note 135)
 Upadhyaya (preceptor)

V
 Vajra (symbol)
 Vallabhi council
 Vasupujya (12th Tirthankara)
 Jain Vegetarianism
 Vegetarianism and religion
 Victoria and Albert Museum (plundered art)
 Vimalanatha (13th Tirthankara)
 Vitalism (philosophy)
 Vrata (vow)

W
 Walters Art Museum
 Water fasting
 Wikimedia (Jain media)
 Six degrees of Wikipedia (four-degree chains)
 WikiProject (Jainism)
  Wiktionary (category) or search (Jainism)
 Women in India
 Women in Jainism
 Jaina Women, The Unknown Pilgrims 
 World Compassion Day
 World peace
 Writers (list)
 Writers (template)

X
 Xenagogues (spiritual guides)
 Xenonym (History of the Punjab)
 Xerophagy (characteristic of fasting practices)
 X-Men (comics)
 Xuanzang (Chinese monk)

Y
 Yantra (mystical diagram)
 Yati (monk)
 Year 297 BCE
 Year 300 BCE
 Year 500 BCE
 Year 599 BCE
 Year 600 BCE
 Year 900 BCE
 Year 1000 BCE
 Yoga (system)
 Yogi (practitioner)

Z
 Zero
 Zoism (comparative)
 Zoolatry (Animal worship)
 Zootypes (symbology)

See also 

 Jainism

Jainism
Jainism-related lists